The Masik River is a river on Banks Island, in Canada's Northwest Territories.  It is a part of the Arctic Ocean watershed.

The river is named after the polar researcher August Masik (1887–1976).

See also
List of rivers of Canada
List of rivers of the Americas by coastline

References

Rivers of the Northwest Territories
Banks Island